The 2001 Peru shootdown was an incident on 20 April 2001, in which the Peruvian Air Force shot down a civilian floatplane, killing American Christian missionary Veronica "Roni" Bowers and her infant daughter Charity.

While flying into the Loreto Region of Peru, Bowers, her daughter Charity, husband Jim, and six-year-old son Cory were being followed by a United States' Central Intelligence Agency (CIA) observation plane. The Peruvian Air Force was operating as part of the Air Bridge Denial Program. The CIA did not attempt to identify the tail number of the church-owned plane per procedure.

Events leading to death
In a video released by the CIA, the CIA observers can be heard discussing whether the Cessna A185E (with Peruvian registration OB-1408), which had departed the town of Islandia; near the Brazilian border, is a "bandido" (drug plane) or an "amigo" (friendly). A CIA officer then tells a Peruvian Air Force (FAP) official that it may be possible to have the plane land in Iquitos to check. The FAP plane then issues a warning to the plane for not having an authorized flight plan, but the pilot did not hear it because he was on a different frequency. As the Dragonfly prepared to open fire, a CIA officer can be heard saying that the plane "doesn't fit the profile", and another CIA official says, "Ok, I understand this is not our call, but this guy is at 4,500 feet and he is not taking any evasive action. I recommend we follow him. I do not recommend phase 3 [shooting the plane down] at this time."

Later, a Peruvian official asks if "phase 3" is authorized, and the CIA official replies asking if he is "sure it's a bandido". The Peruvian official replies in the affirmative, and the CIA officer says, "If you're sure." The CIA pilot then says, "This is bullshit" and "I think we're making a mistake." The second CIA officer says, "I agree with you." The Dragonfly approached, at which point the pilot of the Bowers' plane makes contact with the Iquitos control tower, noting that the FAP has showed up, and he is not sure what they want.

In the confusion, the CIA plane notes that the pilot Bowers' plane is in contact with the tower, but at 15:55 the Dragonfly opened fire with a minigun. The pilot can be heard yelling, "They're killing me! They're killing us!" The CIA officer says, "Tell them to terminate!" and another officer is heard saying "No! Don't shoot! No más! [No more!]" At this point, the plane is already on fire, and the CIA observed the plane crash into the Amazon River, in the Pebas District, and turn upside down. A CIA officer remarks that if the FAP has a helicopter in the area, they should get it there to rescue them. The CIA plane then observes a boat in the river attempting to rescue the plane's occupants, and one officer says, "Get good video of this." Over the intervening several years since the incident, many had stated that the CIA "ordered" the Peruvian Air Force to shoot down the plane, when this is not the case.

Bowers and her seven-month-old daughter were killed in the shooting. The pilot, Kevin Donaldson, was shot in the leg but managed to land the plane. Roni's husband and her son were not injured.

Aftermath
After the event, the US government temporarily suspended the practice of advising foreign governments on shooting down planes over Peru and Colombia. It also paid compensation of $8 million to the Bowers family and the pilot. The program was discontinued in 2001.

According to a statement released by the CIA, its personnel had no authority either to direct or prohibit actions by the Peruvian government, and CIA officers did not shoot down any airplane. In the Bowers case, CIA personnel protested the identification of the missionary plane as a suspect drug trafficker.

A report by the CIA's inspector general (CIA-OIG) found that the agency had obstructed inquiries into its involvement in the shooting. Peter Hoekstra (the highest ranking Republican on the United States House Permanent Select Committee on Intelligence), who published these findings in November 2008, criticized the CIA for the "needless" deaths.

References

External links
 Final report 

2001 in Peru
21st-century aircraft shootdown incidents
Aviation accidents and incidents in 2001
Aviation accidents and incidents in Peru
Drug-related deaths in Peru
Peru–United States relations
Victims of aviation accidents or incidents in Peru
Military history of Peru